The right lymphatic duct is an important lymphatic vessel that drains the right upper quadrant of the body. It forms various combinations with the right subclavian vein and right internal jugular vein.

Structure 
The right lymphatic duct courses along the medial border of the anterior scalene at the root of the neck. The right lymphatic duct forms various combinations with the right subclavian vein and right internal jugular vein. It is approximately 1.25 cm long.

Variations 
A right lymphatic duct that enters directly into the junction of the internal jugular and subclavian veins is uncommon.

Function 

The right duct drains lymph fluid from:
 the upper right section of the trunk, (right thoracic cavity, via the right bronchomediastinal trunk ),
 the right arm (via the right subclavian trunk ),
 and right side of the head and neck (via the right jugular trunk),
 also, in some individuals, the lower lobe of the left lung.

All other sections of the human body are drained by the thoracic duct.

Clinical significance 
Along with the thoracic duct, the right lymphatic duct is one of the lymphatic structures most likely to be ruptured in the thorax. This can cause chylothorax.

History 
The discovery of this structure has been credited to Niels Stensen.

Additional images

References

External links 

Lymphatics of the torso